Shan S. Tsutsui (born August 9, 1971) is an American politician who was the 13th lieutenant governor of Hawaii from 2012 to 2018. A member of the Democratic Party, he was previously a member of the Hawaii Senate from 2003 to 2012, and he served as President of the Senate from 2010 to 2012. On January 29, 2018, Tsutsui announced his resignation, which was put into effect on January 31.

Early life and education
Born in Wailuku, Tsutsui graduated from Maui High School in 1989 and received a B.A. in Economics from the University of Hawaii in 1994.

Senate
Tsutsui was a member of the Hawaii Senate from 2003 until becoming lieutenant governor in 2012. From 2003 to 2011, he represented district 4, which includes Waihee, Wailuku, and Kahului. Subsequently he represented district 5.

Lieutenant Governor
Following the death of U.S. Senator Daniel Inouye, Governor Neil Abercrombie appointed Lieutenant Governor Brian Schatz to replace Inouye in the U.S. Senate. As president of the Hawaii Senate, Tsutsui was first in line to replace Schatz as lieutenant governor. After consulting with his family, Senate leaders, and Governor Abercrombie, Tsutsui accepted the position. Tsutsui's successor in the Senate (who served until 2014) was selected by Governor Abercrombie from a list of three names submitted by the local Democratic Party central committee. Tsutsui's position as Senate president was filled by Senate vice president Donna Mercado Kim until Senate members voted on a new president on the opening day of the 2013 session.

Tsutsui was elected to a second term as lieutenant governor in 2014. Tsutsui had expected to share the ticket with Abercrombie in the general election, but Ige defeated Abercrombie in the primary. He announced in October 2017 that he would not run for a third term as lieutenant governor in 2018, even though he was eligible to do so because his first term was only the completion of an unexpired term.

Tsutsui resigned as lieutenant governor effective January 31, 2018, to take a job with Strategies 360, a communications firm.

Personal

Tsutsui and his wife Lyndelle have three daughters, Mikayla, Kaylee and Kenna.

Electoral history

See also 
 List of minority governors and lieutenant governors in the United States

References

External links
Office of the Lieutenant Governor of Hawaii

|-

|-

1971 births
21st-century American politicians
Hawaii politicians of Japanese descent
Democratic Party Hawaii state senators
Lieutenant Governors of Hawaii
Living people
People from Maui
Presidents of the Hawaii Senate
University of Hawaiʻi alumni